Scottsdale Community College is a public community college in Scottsdale, Arizona. It is on the eastern boundary of the city on 160 acres (650,000 m2) of land belonging to the Salt River Pima-Maricopa Indian Community. The lease was taken out in 1970 and will expire in 2069. The college is part of the Maricopa County Community College District.

History 
Planning for Scottsdale Community College (SCC) began in 1967. Funding was approved by the MCCCD Governing board on November 5, 1968, for the sum of $5,000,000 to build the campus. In the fall of 1969 SCC began holding night classes at Scottsdale High School, meanwhile on September 21, 1969, the Salt River Pima-Maricopa Indian Community and Bureau of Indian Affairs leased 160 acres of land at Chaparral and Pima Roads for 99 years. In August 1970 SCC held its first classes at its permanent location, several temporary wooden barracks were used as classroom space while construction began on the campus. The campus was designed by Phoenix architects Drover, Welch & Lindlan and built between 1970 and 1972. In 1974 SCC established it's nursing program and revived full accreditation in 1975. In 1977 the performing arts center opened which was designed by Phoenix architects Guirey, Srnka Arnold & Sprinkle. A new music building was added in 1980. In 1982 the schools Culinary Arts Program Restaurant opened as did the Community Garden. On April 1, 1986, ground was broken for the Social Behavioral Science Building. By 1990 student population was at 10,000 as compared to 1000 students in 1970. The Applied Sciences Building opened in 1998 and was designed by local architect Doug Sydnor and is home to The Artichoke Grill. The school's library which was built in the early 1970s was renovated in 2015. The Cloud Song Center for business students opened in 2018.

Campus 

Unique among colleges, SCC is the only public community college located on tribal land. The college also hosts NAU-Scottsdale, which offers several undergraduate programs, as well as the SCC2NAU program. SCC2NAU is a joint admission program between Scottsdale Community College and Northern Arizona University.

Academics 
Scottsdale Community College offers associate degrees as well as Certificates of Completion.

Notable alumni

Ryneldi Becenti, the first Native American to play in the WNBA
 Scott Emerson, Major League Baseball pitching coach
Tim Esmay, former Arizona State head baseball coach
Robert Garrigus, PGA Tour professional
Bill Hader, actor (Saturday Night Live cast member (2005–2013), Trainwreck)
 Josh Miller (born 1970), American football player and football analyst
David Spade, actor (Saturday Night Live, Just Shoot Me!, Rules of Engagement, The Benchwarmers, The Emperor's New Groove)
Charlie Garner, former NFL football player
Will Tukuafu, Samoan-American NFL football player for the Chargers
Terry Wright, former NFL football player

References

Gallery

External links 
 Official website

 

Maricopa County Community College District
Educational institutions established in 1970
Education in Scottsdale, Arizona
Community colleges in Arizona
Buildings and structures in Scottsdale, Arizona
Universities and colleges in Maricopa County, Arizona
NJCAA athletics